Anathallis imbricata is a species of orchid.

References 

imbricata